Maamerkki (Finnish for "landmark") is a high-rise building on Kauppakartanonkatu street near the Lyypekinaukio square in Itäkeskus in the Vartiokylä district of Helsinki, Finland. The building is 82 metres high and has 19 floors. There is a viewing terrace at the top. The building was completed in 1987 and was designed by architect Erkki Kairamo. The building currently has over 50 apartments and premises of several businesses.

Maamerkki is currently the sixth highest high-rise building in Finland and the third highest in Helsinki (after Majakka in Kalasatama and Cirrus in Vuosaari). In spring 2014 the building was renamed Helmitorni ("pearl tower").

Architecture
The 82-metre-high glassed staircase is one of the most distinctive marks of the facade of the building. Together with the glass beacon on top of the tower they form a large-scale suprematist cross. The staircase reaching for the skies emphasises the height of the building. To achieve this, the air conditioning channels leading up to the roof were placed outside the structure of the building. With these architectural solutions the shape of the building has become quite slender despite the building only having 16 proper floors.

The construction company Haka held an architectural competition in 1977 to build the building. The competition was won by the architecture bureau Gullichsen, Kairamo, Voimala Arkkitehdit Ky with their suggestion Valomerkki ("light signal"). From its completion up to 2006 it was the highest building in Helsinki, a "spike" standing out from the Helsinki skyline. The glassed staircase outside the building is lit during the dark. The structure of the building was cast in place from concrete and the facade is made of cement clinker.

The owner of the building sought permission in autumn 2013 to convert floors 4 through 17 of the building into apartments.

Gallery

References

External links
 

Residential buildings in Helsinki